Earl B. Thompson (died 1924) was an American football coach, and the very first football coach of Harding College, in 1924.

According to the Harding yearbook The Petit Jean, he was killed in a car wreck 3 or 4 games into the season. Afterward, the team dissolved for the year:

It is not known if that statement was written by representatives of the team itself, or by editors of the yearbook staff. Thompson's name was not mentioned in the entry. He was referred to as "our coach."

The first game in Harding football history was a 0-38 loss to College of the Ozarks. The next two games were a win over Dardanelle High School and a 10-7 victory over Arkansas Tech University's third string team. Arkansas Tech would still be a Harding rival a century later.

References

1925 deaths
Harding Bisons football coaches